Saint Kitts and Nevis is scheduled to compete at the 2021 Junior Pan American Games in Cali–Valle, Colombia from November 25 to December 5, 2021.

The Saint Kitts and Nevis team of three athletes (one male and two females) competing in two sports: athletics (track and field) and tennis was officially named on November 19, 2021.

Competitors
The following is the list of number of competitors (per gender) participating at the games per sport/discipline.

Athletics (track and field

Saint Kitts and Nevis qualified two track and field athletes (one male and one female).

Men
Tah’j Liburd - 400m

Women
Amya Clarke - 100m

Tennis

Saint Kitts and Nevis qualified one female tennis athlete.

Women
Arina Volitova

References

Nations at the 2021 Junior Pan American Games
2021 Junior
2021 in Saint Kitts and Nevis